Get Away Clean is the debut studio album by Master P.

Track listing

References

Master P albums
1991 debut albums
No Limit Records albums